Alexandru Szatmary (19 December 1894 – 23 February 1963) was a Romanian football goalkeeper.

International career
Alexandru Szatmary played six games at international level for Romania, making his debut in a friendly which ended 1–1 against Poland. He also played one game at the successful 1929–31 Balkan Cup in a 5–2 home victory against Bulgaria.

Honours
Romania
Balkan Cup: 1929–31

References

External links
 

1894 births
1963 deaths
Romanian footballers
Romania international footballers
Association football goalkeepers